Parkway Central High School is a public high school in Chesterfield, Missouri that is part of the Parkway School District.

History
Five elementary school districts merged to form the Parkway Consolidated School District.  The name for the district was proposed by a fourth grader from Barretts Elementary School. The name "Parkway" was in honor of the Daniel Boone Parkway, which is also known as Highway 40 (now I-64). The road passes through the center of the district. The word Consolidated was later dropped as sounding too rural in the rapidly growing and changing district.

Parkway Central was the first high school built in the new district. The original high school was converted to a junior high school when the present high school was built in 1961.  There are now a total of five high schools in the district (Central, North, West, South, and Fern Ridge).

In September 2021, several hundred students walked out of class after racist graffiti was found at the school.  Students walked to the school's administrative building, and chanted "no justice, no peace".  The school later disclosed that a black student had written the graffiti.  The school's superintendent wrote a letter to the community saying the student's race "does not diminish the hurt it caused or the negative impact it has on our entire community".

Activities
For the 2011–2012 school year, the school offered 27 activities approved by the Missouri State High School Activities Association (MSHSAA): baseball, boys and girls basketball, cheerleading, boys and girls cross country, dance team, football, boys and girls golf, girls lacrosse, music activities, scholar bowl, boys and girls soccer, softball, speech and debate, boys and girls swimming and diving, boys and girls tennis, boys and girls track and field, boys and girls volleyball, water polo, and wrestling. The school does not sponsor a boys ice hockey club. The school newspaper is the Corral, which is a member of the High School National Ad Network. There is a marching band, the "Parkway Central Marching Colts" that plays at football games in the fall as well as marching competitions. The band students then play in either a concert or symphonic band after football season ends. The concert band is available during football season as well for those who can not or would prefer not to march.

Notable alumni

Michael Avenatti '89, attorney and  convicted felon
Gary Barnett '64, former head football coach at the University of Colorado and Northwestern University
Isaac Byrd '93, former wide receiver for the Tennessee Titans and Carolina Panthers
Brad Cohen '92, Author/Motivational Speaker, "Front of the Class - How Tourette Syndrome made me the teacher I never had"
Mark Fauser '79, film and television writer
Bryan Greenberg '96, actor
Joel Higgins '62, actor
James Kerwin '91, independent film director
Mark Lemley '84, William H. Neukom Professor of Law at Stanford Law School
Amber Lyon '01, three-time Emmy Award-winning investigative journalist and former CNN investigative reporter.
Robin Lynn Macy '77, one of the original Dixie Chicks
Trista Rehn '91, reality television show star, The Bachelorette
Khalen Saunders '14, Professional football player for the Kansas City Chiefs
Glenn Savan '71, author of the book which was the basis of the movie White Palace
Max Scherzer '03, starting pitcher for the New York Mets, Cy Young Award winner
Dave Silvestri  ’85, Former MLB player (New York Yankees, Montreal Expos, Texas Rangers, Tampa Bay Rays, Anaheim Angels)
Ryan Young '94, former offensive tackle for the New York Jets and Houston Texans
Preston Elliot (Preston Wilson) '86, co-host of the Preston & Steve show on WMMR

References

External links
Corral - Student Newspaper
Parkway Alumni Organization

High schools in St. Louis County, Missouri
Educational institutions established in 1954
Public high schools in Missouri
1954 establishments in Missouri
Buildings and structures in St. Louis County, Missouri